Oberea pedemontana is a species of beetle in the family Cerambycidae. It was described by Chevrolat in 1856. It has a wide distribution in Europe. It feeds on Rhamnus alpina and Frangula alnus.

Species
 Oberea pedemontana pedemontana Chevrolat, 1856
 Oberea pedemontana koniensis Breuning, 1960

References

pedemontana
Beetles described in 1856